Arena Zagallo is a proposed stadium that was originally conditional on a successful bid by Brazil for the 2014 FIFA World Cup. The Arena was meant to be built in Maceió, and the stadium was named after Mário Zagallo, prolific club manager and former World Cup-winning Brazil manager, born in the city.

References 

Zagallo
Unbuilt stadiums
Sports venues in Alagoas